Goran Drmić (born 4 January 1988) is a Bosnian-Herzegovinian former professional footballer.

External links
 

1988 births
Living people
Sportspeople from Zenica
Croats of Bosnia and Herzegovina
Association football defenders
Bosnia and Herzegovina footballers
NK Zagreb players
NK Istra 1961 players
NK Karlovac players
FC Moscow players
FC Volgar Astrakhan players
PFC Krylia Sovetov Samara players
Croatian Football League players
First Football League (Croatia) players
Russian Premier League players
Russian First League players
Bosnia and Herzegovina expatriate footballers
Expatriate footballers in Croatia
Bosnia and Herzegovina expatriate sportspeople in Croatia
Expatriate footballers in Russia
Bosnia and Herzegovina expatriate sportspeople in Russia